Munipoese Muliʻakaʻaka (born ~1974) is a Wallisian politician and member of the Territorial Assembly of Wallis and Futuna. He was unanimously elected president of the Territorial Assembly of Wallis and Futuna in March 2022.

References

Living people
Wallis and Futuna politicians
Presidents of the Territorial Assembly of Wallis and Futuna
Year of birth missing (living people)